The Peruvian pelican (Pelecanus thagus) is a member of the pelican family. It lives on the west coast of South America, breeding in loose colonies from about 33.5° in central Chile to Piura in northern Peru, and occurring as a visitor in southern Chile and Ecuador.

Description
These birds are dark in colour with a white stripe from the top of the bill up to the crown and down the sides of the neck. They have long tufted feathers on the top of their heads. It was previously considered a subspecies of the brown pelican (Pelecanus occidentalis). Compared to the brown pelican, it also has proportionally longer crest feathers, as well as differences in the colours of the gular pouch, beak, scapulars and greater wing coverts.

Behaviour

Breeding
The main breeding season occurs from September to March. Clutch size is usually two or three eggs. Eggs are incubated for approximately 4 to 5 weeks, with the rearing period lasting about 3 months.

Feeding
This bird feeds on several species of fish. Unlike the brown pelican, it never dives from a great height to catch its food, instead diving from a shallow height or feeding while swimming on the surface. On occasion it may take other food items, such as nestling of imperial shags, young Peruvian diving petrels, gray gulls and cannibalize unrelated chicks of its own species.

Conservation
Its status was first evaluated for the IUCN Red List in 2008, being listed as Near threatened.

Gallery

References

External links
Mundo Azul Species Factsheet

Peruvian pelican
Peruvian pelican
Birds of Peru
Birds of Chile
Western South American coastal birds
Peruvian pelican